The superior thalamostriate vein or terminal vein commences in the groove between the corpus striatum and thalamus, receives numerous veins from both of these parts, and unites behind the crus of the fornix  with the superior choroid vein to form each of the internal cerebral veins.

References 

Veins of the head and neck
Thalamus